Brixton was built in the United States of America in 1802, with sources disagreeing on where, and under a different name. The British Royal Navy seized her in 1805 and she was sold in prize. She then traded widely, sailing to the West Indies, Canada, Bengal, Australia, and Russia. Between 1835 and 1842 she made two voyages to the southern whale fishery as a whaling ship, and was last listed in 1842.

Career
The Royal Navy seized the vessel that would become Brixton for trading with the French. A prize court condemned her on 26 April 1805 and new owners named her Brixton. 

Early in May 1819 Brixton, London, master, had to put back into Bengal two days after sailing as she had spring a leak. By 17 August she was at the Cape of Good Hope. She did not sail from the Cape until 23 December.

Brixton, Captain Lusk, sailed on 24 April 1821, from London for Australia, She reached Hobart in August and then arrived on 16 September at Sydney. She was not a convict transport per se, but she apparently carried convicts between colonies in both 1821 and on a second voyage in 1823. Most of the passengers aboard Brixton were free passengers, and on this first visit to Australia she brought missionaries. She sailed from Port Jackson on 26 November and Hobart on 29 December for London, via the Cape of Good Hope.

On 19 January 1823 Brixton arrived at Hobart with passengers. She sailed to Sydney from Hobart with a  notable passenger, John Dunmore Lang, who had come out to Hobart aboard . Lang intended to establish a Presbyterian Church in Sydney.

On 24 May Brixton was at anchor at Sydney during a thunderstorm. A lightning bolt struck her mainmast, destroying it. Later she transported seven convicts to Port Macquarie.

A report dated Plymouth 30 June 1824 stated that Brixton, Stevens, master, would have to unload to effect repairs. She had been on her way from London to Quebec when she became leaky.

LL printed a letter dated Archangel, 8 September 1826, that  reported that Brixton, Peters, master, had arrived there from Newcastle, but had run aground on the bar. Peters had thought it necessary to heave her down, although he did not believe that she had sustained damage.

Whaler
1st whaling voyage (1835–1838): Captain J.Elbourn sailed from London in 1835. Brixton returned with 450 casks of whale oil on 14 March 1838.

2nd whaling voyage (1838–1842): Captain John Elbourn sailed from London on 4 July 1838. Brixton returned to London on 2 August 1842 with 300 casks of whale oil.

Fate

Brixton was last listed in 1842.

Citations and references
Citations

References

1802 ships
Ships built in the United States
Captured ships
Age of Sail merchant ships of England
Whaling ships